Vugar is a masculine given name. Notable people with the name include:

 Vugar Alakbarov (born 1981), Azerbaijani boxer
 Vugar Bayramov (economist) (born 1975), Azerbaijani economist
 Vugar Gashimov (born 1986), Azerbaijani chess player
 Vugar Mehdiyev (21st century), Azerbaijani Paralympic athlete
 Vugar Orujov (born 1971), Russian sport wrestler

Masculine given names